Audra Morrison (née Richards) is an American ice hockey forward, currently playing for the Minnesota Whitecaps of the Premier Hockey Federation.

Career 
Over four years at the University of Maine, Richards set the team record for games played with 132, and put up 45 goals (the fifth most in team history), being selected to the Hockey East All-Academic Team four times.

On July 9, 2018, Richards signed her first professional contract, with the Metropolitan Riveters of the NWHL. In her rookie season, she put up 8 goals in 16 games. After just one year with the Riveters, however, she signed with the Minnesota Whitecaps. In her first season with the Whitecaps, she put up 20 points in 24 games, and was named to Team Packer for the All-Star Game.

Personal life 
Richards has a degree in kinesiology, and has taught physical education in Minnesota. She originally played soccer, before switching to hockey.

Her parents designed the Minnesota Whitecaps' mascot Cappy, unveiled in January 2020.

Career statistics

References

External links
 

1994 births
Living people
American women's ice hockey forwards
Maine Black Bears women's ice hockey players
Minnesota Whitecaps players
People from Maplewood, Minnesota
Ice hockey players from Minnesota